Dactyladenia cinerea is a species of plant in the family Chrysobalanaceae. It is endemic to Cameroon.  It is threatened by habitat loss.

References

cinerea
Flora of Cameroon
Critically endangered plants
Taxonomy articles created by Polbot
Taxa named by Émile Auguste Joseph De Wildeman